The Montabaur Heights are a 10 to 15 kilometre long, mostly wooded hill ridge in the southwestern Westerwald in Germany and lies mainly within the county of Westerwaldkreis. The ridge is geographically classified as sub-natural region 324.1 of the Lower Westerwald (major unit 324) and has its highest hill, the  Alarmstange, whose summit rises six kilometres west of the town of Montabaur and about 12 km northeast of Koblenz.

Literature 
 Mischa Ferdinand, Ursula Braun: Die Farnflora der Montabaurer Höhe, Zweckverb. Naturpark Nassau, 1997

Westerwaldkreis
Regions of the Westerwald
Central Uplands